Spilarctia persimilis is a moth in the family Erebidae. It was described by Walter Rothschild in 1914. It is found in Papua, Indonesia, where it is restricted to the Central Mountain Range.

References

Moths described in 1914
persimilis